Humdrum is a 1998 British animated comedy short film directed by Peter Peake. It was released in 1998 and produced by Aardman Animations and received an Academy Award nomination for Best Animated Short Film and a BAFTA nomination in the same category.

Plot summary

The film features two anonymous Scottish-accented Shadow Puppets (voiced by Jack Docherty and Moray Hunter) who are sitting around a table with nothing to do. They explore and reject several options including watching television (the only thing on is 'some weird animation thing'), listening to the radio (but 'it's all the same rubbish these days' - in this case La Cucaracha) and playing chess (the white pieces have been eaten due to a bet). This is briefly interrupted when the doorbell rings and one character answers it to find a pesky dog (who is, in fact, a double-glazing salesman) before the other persuades him to enter into a game of shadow puppets. The first character is frustrated by his acquaintance's appalling representation of a cow and later his failure to recognize a rather fantastic rabbit (His misled guesses include a 'fireman chasing an igloo' and an 'Otter with two sausage strapped to his head'). After an amusing outburst from the poor fellow, his annoying partner accuses him of being 'shirty'. This leads him to explode, furiously crying "I'm stuck indoors playing 'Guess the misshapen beast' with someone who clearly wouldn't recognise a rabbit if it came to his house for tea, said 'What's up Doc?' and started burrowing into his head! There are blind people with no fingers who are better at shadow puppets than you! No wonder I'm a tad miffed!" An awkward silence follows this, until the doorbell rings and the first character goes to answer it and finds the second character's 'cow' shadow puppet, which moos. Despite being disappointed with being wrong about a cow's appearance, he simply responds to this with a cheery "Not today, thank you." and closes the door in front of the camera, thus ending the animation.

Cast
 Jack Docherty
 Moray Hunter

Film technique
The film employs a distinctive stop motion cutout animation technique to animate the shadow puppets, making them move in ways that traditional shadow puppets cannot but retaining the impression of being projected onto everyday backgrounds.

Credits
Lighting Camera: Andy MacCormack, Jeremy Hogg, Toby Howell
Design: Peter Peake
Music: Andy Price
Editor: Nick Upton
Script Doctor: Richard Goleszowski
Dubbing Editors: James Mather, Ben Jones
Dialogue Editor: Tamsin Parry
Sparks: John Bradley, John Truckle
Technical Boffs: Janet Legg, Alan Yates
Titles: Marc Day
Cutting Room Assistant: Maggie O'Connor
Production Assistants: Lisa Pavitt, Margaret House-Hayes
Heap Big Thanks to: The Puppet Factory, Big Fat Studios, Pete Atkin, Maxine Guest, Claire Jennings, Terry Krejzl, Helen Nabarro, Lynda Ware
Producers: Carla Shelley, Michael Rose
Associate Producer: Julie Lockhart
Executive Producers: Peter Lord, David Sproxton
Written and Directed by: Peter Peake

See also
List of stop-motion films
Silhouette animation (a similar technique but with the light coming from behind)

External links
Homepage

Humdrum on Vimeo

References

1998 films
British animated short films
Stop-motion animated short films
1998 comedy films
1990s animated short films
British comedy short films
1990s stop-motion animated films
1990s English-language films
1990s British films